Grażyna Maria Kostrzewińska, née Osmańska (born 26 November 1950 in Toruń) is a Polish former pair skater. With Adam Brodecki, she placed 11th at the 1972 Winter Olympics in Sapporo. From 1972, she competed as Grażyna Kostrzewińska, having married footballer Zdzisław Kostrzewiński in 1971.

Results

With Brodecki

With Górecki

References 

1950 births
Polish female pair skaters
Olympic figure skaters of Poland
Living people
Sportspeople from Toruń
Figure skaters at the 1972 Winter Olympics